Bedardi Se Pyar is the 1992 full-length by Attaullah Khan Esakhelvi; it was produced by Gulshan Kumar.

Track listing

References

1992 albums
Urdu-language albums